The Afterman (Live Edition) is a live album released by rock band Coheed and Cambria. It was bundled with the deluxe version of The Afterman, and was also available as a download from the band's website.

Track listing

Coheed and Cambria albums
2013 live albums